Novinka is a rural locality (a village) in Nikolskoye Rural Settlement, Kaduysky District, Vologda Oblast, Russia. The population was 20 as of 2002.

Geography 
Novinka is located 37 km northeast of Kaduy (the district's administrative centre) by road. Panyukovo is the nearest rural locality.

References 

Rural localities in Kaduysky District